Packard's Corner is located in Boston, Massachusetts at the intersection of Commonwealth Avenue and Brighton Avenue.  Packard's Corner is serviced by the Packards Corner stop on the B branch of the MBTA's Green Line, a light rail line that runs mostly above ground. According to the Brighton Allston Historical Society, the name comes from Packard's Sales Stable and Riding School which existed in the area from 1885 through 1920, and was perpetuated by the Packard automobile dealership that was built in 1910. The corner is also the former home of Maverick Designs, a longtime supplier of unfinished wood products.

The former A branch once forked with the B line at Packard's Corner where the A line continued onto Brighton Avenue towards Allston's Union Square.

References

External links

 Packard's Corner: The Once and Future City - MIT

Neighborhoods in Boston